Aaron Berechiah ben Moses ben Nehemiah of Modena (1549-1639) was an Italian cabalist. He is the author of Ma'abar Yabboḳ, which contains dissertations on separation, purity, and holiness.

Biography 
Aaron Berachiah was a pupil of Rabbi Hillel of Modena (surnamed Ḥasid we-Ḳaddosh, that is, "The Pious and Holy") and of the Italian Kabbalist Rabbi Menahem Azariah of Fano. He was an associate of Rabbi Yehuda Aryeh de Modena and Rabbi Israel Sarug who was a student of the Safed Kabbalist Isaac Luria. His brother-in-law was Rabbi Yosef Yedidya Krami, the author of Kanaf Renanim.

His work was Ashmoret haBoḳer (1624), complied for a prayer group. At the request of the Ḥebrah Ḳaddisha (Burial Society) at Mantua he instituted rites for them. Added to these are prayers to be offered for the sick and the dead, as well as rules for their treatment. To avert possible criticism for failing to discuss these themes philosophically, he makes use of the statement of Isaac Arama in his book Aḳedat Yiẓḥaḳ (chap. xxv.): "Reason must surrender some of its rights to the divine revelations which are superior to it."

Persecution by the Church 
He was arrested and imprisoned in 1636 for possessing forbidden books, namely, those singled out for censorship, expurgation or confiscation because of passages putatively critical of Christians. In his defense, he stated:
I have nothing else to say, but because the Holy Inquisition tolerates us in its States, consequently we are also allowed to own these books, which deal with our ceremonies, because it is impossible for us to live in these countries if we do not have books that teach us the principles of our faith, and although Your Lordship told us that Clemente VIII promulgated the bull that banned a number of books from the Jews, to my knowledge this bull has never been enforced, neither were the books confiscated from the Jews. Furthermore, even [Christian] preachers sometimes cite the Shulchan Aruch, Rav Alfassi, or similar books to convince the Jews [to convert] and they could not do this if we were prohibited to read or to own these books.'

Books
Berechiah authored a number of works:
 Ma'abar Yabboḳ (Crossing the Yabboḳ), Kabbalistic text on the meaning of Jewish purity rituals. This text was translated into Yiddish by a Jewish woman, Ellus Bat Mordecai of Slutsk (Belarus).
 Ashmoret haBoḳer (The Watches of the Morning) (1624), prayers to be said in the early morning, arranged for the society called "Me'ire ha-Shaḥar" (Awakeners of the Morning), and therefore also published under this name.
 Me'il Ẓedaḳah (The Cloak of Righteousness), on worship and study, published at Mantua in 1767, together with Bigde Ḳodesh (Garments of Holiness), on the same subject.
 Bigde Ḳodesh (Garments of Holiness), on worship and study
 Ḥibbur beḲabbalah, a work on the Cabala, consisting of four volumes:
 Shemen Mishḥat Ḳodesh (The Oil of Holy Anointment), on the principles of the Cabala according to Moses Cordovero and Isaac Luria
 Shemen Zait Zak (The Pure Oil of the Olive), public addresses on the same subject
 Shetil Poreaḥ (The Blossoming Plant), on the mysterious meaning of prayers and ceremonies
 Imre Shefer (Words of Beauty), and miscellaneous matter; this whole work was seen in manuscript by Azulai at Modena, and is found in parts in some libraries.
 Magen Aharon (Shield of Aaron), containing a compendium of Luria's works. This fertile writer is said to have been, like Joseph Caro, in constant communion with a spirit called the Maggid.
 A commentary on Tiḳḳune ha-Zohar

References

Year of birth unknown
1639 deaths
17th-century Italian Jews
Italian religious writers
Authors of Kabbalistic works